The canton of Vertus-Plaine Champenoise is an administrative division of the Marne department, northeastern France. It was created at the French canton reorganisation which came into effect in March 2015. Its seat is in Blancs-Coteaux.

It consists of the following communes:
 
Allemanche-Launay-et-Soyer
Anglure
Angluzelles-et-Courcelles
Athis
Bagneux
Bannes
Baudement
Bergères-lès-Vertus
Blancs-Coteaux
Broussy-le-Grand
La Celle-sous-Chantemerle
Chaintrix-Bierges
Chaltrait
La Chapelle-Lasson
Clamanges
Clesles
Conflans-sur-Seine
Connantray-Vaurefroy
Connantre
Corroy
Courcemain
Écury-le-Repos
Esclavolles-Lurey
Étréchy
Euvy
Faux-Fresnay
Fère-Champenoise
Germinon
Givry-lès-Loisy
Gourgançon
Granges-sur-Aube
Loisy-en-Brie
Marcilly-sur-Seine
Marigny
Marsangis
Le Mesnil-sur-Oger
Moslins
Ognes
Pierre-Morains
Pleurs
Pocancy
Potangis
Rouffy
Saint-Just-Sauvage
Saint-Mard-lès-Rouffy
Saint-Quentin-le-Verger
Saint-Saturnin
Saron-sur-Aube
Soulières
Thaas
Trécon
Val-des-Marais
Vélye
Vert-Toulon
Villeneuve-Renneville-Chevigny
Villers-aux-Bois
Villeseneux
Villiers-aux-Corneilles
Vouarces
Vouzy

References

Cantons of Marne (department)